Jess M. Stairs (born June 5, 1942) is an American politician who served as a Republican member of the Pennsylvania House of Representatives, representing the 59th District from 1977 to 2008.   In 2002, he was a candidate to replace John E. Barley as Majority Chair of the House Appropriations Committee, eventually losing to Dave Argall. In an open letter to the House Caucus announcing his candidacy, Stairs criticized Barley's dual positions as both chair of the House Republican Campaign Committee and chair of the Appropriations Committee. He expressed his desire to work with John Perzel, saying that "John Perzel is a city fellow and fights like an alley cat.  I will join him as a country boy and fight like a barn cat."

He and his wife live in Acme, Pennsylvania and have 2 children. He retired prior to the 2008 election was succeeded by Republican Mike Reese.

References

External links
Pennsylvania House of Representatives - Jess Stairs official PA House website (archived)
Pennsylvania House Republican Caucus - Representative Jess Stairs official caucus website (archived)
Biography, voting record, and interest group ratings at Project Vote Smart

1942 births
Living people
People from Mount Pleasant, Pennsylvania
Republican Party members of the Pennsylvania House of Representatives
Pennsylvania State University alumni